Anokha is a 1975 Bollywood film.

Anokha may also refer to:
 Anokha Bandhan
 Anokha Rishta
 Anokha Pyar
 Anokha Ladla